Allendale County is a county located in the U.S. state of South Carolina. As of the 2020 census, the population was 8,039, making it the least populous county in South Carolina. Its county seat is Allendale.

History
Allendale County was formed in 1919 from southwestern portions of Barnwell County, along the Savannah River, and part of Hampton County, just to its south.  It is the location of the Topper Site, an archeological excavation providing possible evidence of a pre-Clovis culture dating back 50,000 years.  The site is near a source of chert on private land in Martin owned by Clariant Corporation, a Swiss chemical company with a plant there.  The site, named after John Topper, a local resident who discovered it, has been under excavation by archeologists from the University of South Carolina for about one month a year since 1999, after an initial exploratory dig in the mid-1980s.

Geography

The Savannah River forms the county's western border with Georgia.

Allendale is 62 miles from Augusta, Georgia; 73 miles from Savannah, Georgia; 87 miles from Columbia; and 90 miles from Charleston.  Before interstate highways were built, Allendale had several motels, primarily serving travelers going between Northeastern states and Florida.  Traffic that formerly traveled U.S. 301 through Allendale now uses Interstate-95.

Major water bodies 
 Coosawhatchie River
 Salkehatchie River
 Savannah River

Adjacent counties
 Bamberg County – northeast
 Colleton County – east
 Hampton County – southeast
 Screven County, Georgia – southwest
 Burke County, Georgia – west
 Barnwell County – northwest

Major highways

Major infrastructure 
 Savannah River Site (part)

Demographics

2020 census

As of the 2020 United States census, there were 8,039 people, 3,365 households, and 2,011 families residing in the county.

2010 census
At the 2010 census, there were 10,419 people, 3,706 households, and 2,333 families living in the county. The racial makeup of the county was 73.6% black or African American, 23.7% white, 0.4% Asian, 0.2% American Indian, 1.3% from other races, and 0.8% from two or more races. Those of Hispanic or Latino origin made up 2.3% of the population. In terms of ancestry, and 5.6% were American.

Of the 3,706 households, 32.2% had children under the age of 18 living with them, 31.5% were married couples living together, 26.9% had a female householder with no husband present, 37.0% were non-families, and 33.7% of households were made up of individuals. The average household size was 2.45 and the average family size was 3.14. The median age was 38.8 years.

The median household income was $20,081 and the median family income  was $25,146. Males had a median income of $30,440 versus $28,889 for females. The per capita income for the county was $14,190. About 35.7% of families and 42.4% of the population were below the poverty line, including 53.8% of those under age 18 and 27.4% of those age 65 or over.

2000 census
At the 2000 census there were 11,211 people, 3,915 households and 2,615 families living in the county.  The population density was 28 people per square mile (11/km2).  There were 4,568 housing units at an average density of 11 per square mile (4/km2).  The racial makeup of the county was 71.0 percent Black or African American, 27.37 percent White, 0.12 percent Asian, 0.09 percent Native American, 0.06 percent Pacific Islander, 0.85 percent from other races, and 0.51 percent from two or more races.  1.61 percent of the population were Hispanic or Latino of any race.
Of the 3,915 households 30.3 percent had children under the age of 18 living with them, 35.8 percent were married couples living together, 25.8 percent had a female householder with no husband present, and 33.2 percent were non-families. 30.0 percent of all households were one person and 12.3 percent had someone living alone who was 65 or older.  The average household size was 2.56 and the average family size was 3.21.

The age distribution was 26.6 percent under the age of 18, 9.8 percent from 18 to 24, 28.2 percent from 25 to 44, 22.8 percent from 45 to 64, and 12.7 percent who were 65 or older.  The median age was 35 years. For every 100 females there were 108.6 males. For every 100 females age 18 and over, there were 107.5 males.

The median household income was $20,898 and the median family income  was $27,348. Males had a median income of $25,930 versus $20,318 for females. The per capita income for the county was $11,293.  About 28.4 percent of families and 34.5 percent of the population were below the poverty line, including 48.1 percent of those under age 18 and 26.00 percent of those age 65 or over.

Government and politics
Allendale County has been consistently Democratic in Presidential voting since 1976 and was among the few counties to be carried by Walter Mondale in 1984. In the 2008 U.S. presidential election Barack Obama received 75.3 percent of the county's vote. In the 2012 U.S. presidential election Barack Obama received 79.2 percent of the county's vote. In the 2020 U.S presidentional election Joe Biden received 75.7% of the vote.

Economy
Allendale is primarily an agricultural rural county. Its primary products are cotton, soybeans, watermelon and cantaloupe. Timbering is also important, primarily for paper pulp.

Education
Robert McNair, Democratic Governor of South Carolina from 1965 to 1971, moved to Allendale County as an adult because his wife was from there. Because of McNair's influence, USC-Salkahatchie (a two-year campus) was located in the town of Allendale. The county is also the site of WEBA, Channel 14, a broadcast outlet of the South Carolina Educational Television Network. Ranking 45th in population among the state's 46 counties, it is the smallest county to have either a state-supported college or an ETV station. Allendale County School District includes one high school:  Allendale-Fairfax High School. The former C. V. Bing High School served African-American students during the time of segregation. Denmark Tech, part of the state Technical College System, serves the county from its location in Bamberg County, 25 miles from Allendale.

Communities

Towns
 Allendale (county seat and largest town)
 Fairfax
 Sycamore
 Ulmer

Unincorporated communities
 Appleton
 Martin

See also
 List of counties in South Carolina
 National Register of Historic Places listings in Allendale County, South Carolina
 SC High Schools

References

External links

 
 
 Allendale Country history and images

 
1919 establishments in South Carolina
Populated places established in 1919
Black Belt (U.S. region)
Majority-minority counties in South Carolina